José Luis García Muñoz (born 20 January 1944), known professionally as José Luis Garci, is a Spanish film director, producer, critic, TV presenter, screenwriter and author. He earned worldwide acclaim and his country's first Best Foreign Language Film Academy Award for Begin the Beguine (1982). Four of his films, including also Sesión continua (1984), Asignatura aprobada (1987) and El abuelo (1998), have been nominated for the Academy Award for Best Foreign Language Film, more than any other Spanish director. His films are characterized for his classical style and the underlying sentimentality of their plots.

Early life and work
Born in 1944 in a humble family from Asturias. After completing a pre-university course, Garci began working as an administrative assistant in a bank. His love for cinema from an early age led him to pursue filmmaking as a career. At age twenty he began writing reviews for a number of film magazines such as: Signos, Cinestudio, Aun and Resena, winning an award in 1968 from the Circulo de Escritores Cinematograficos for his work as film critic.

At the same time, he wrote his first literary works, science fiction stories like : Bibidibabibidibú, Adam Blake, and La Gioconda está triste. He also published the essay: Ray Bradbury humanista del futuro  and an article about science fiction films in the Encyclopedia Buru-La.

In 1969 he became involved in scriptwriting, receiving his first screen credits for Antonio Giménez Rico  The Cronicón (The Chronicle) (1970).

Between 1972 and 1977 he scripted five more films: León Klimovsky  La casa de las chivas (The House of the goats);  Pedro Olea  No es bueno que el hombre esté solo (1972), (A Man Shouldn't be Alone);  Eloy de la Iglesia  Una gota de sangre para morir amando, (1973) (A drop of blood to die loving); Antonio Drove Mi mujer es muy decente dentro de lo que cabe (1974) o Roberto Bodegas Vida conyugal sana  (1973)(Healthy Married Life) and  Los nuevos españoles (1974)(New Spaniards). During this same period, Garci also wrote the made for T.V film La Cabina (1972)(The Cabin) directed by Antonio Mercero. He then directed his first short films: !Al Futbol! (!To Football!) Mi Marilyn, (My Marilyn) (both 1975) and Tiempo de gente acobardada (People Cowed Time) (1976).

Feature films 
In 1977, José Luis Garci directed his first feature film Asignatura pendiente (Unfinished Business) from a script by Gonzalez Sinde, a love story between an old pair of lovers which runs parallel to the social and political changes lived in Spain after the fall of Francisco Franco's regime. The film was well received by critics and audiences, becoming the most successful representative of the Spanish film of the generation of the  Transition from dictatorship to democracy who saw themselves in a social and political limbo. A simple story of an amorous seduction by the film's hero is set around a series of topical references to a generation of Spaniards born in the immediate post-civil war period whose frustrations and nostalgia are embodied in the film's protagonist. Gaci took his narrative cues from the visual patterns followed in the traditional Hollywood narrative.

Garci second film Solos en la madrugada (Alone in the Dark) (1978) became skilled tackling progressive social themes intended for an audience interested neither in elite art cinema nor in the popular style of most Spanish comedies. He used this same pattern in his third film, Las verdes praderas (The Green Meadows) (1979), in which heavy sentimentality, a constant in his films, became more apparent.

The director changed gears with El Crack (1981), in which he used the figure of the hard boiled detective in a story inspired by the novels of Dashiell Hammett, to whom the film is dedicated, and employing elements of the American film noirs of the 1930s and 40s giving it a Spanish flavor. The formula worked so well that two years later Garci made a sequel, El crack II (1983).

Between this two films, Garci made his most emblematic work Volver a empezar, (Begin to Beguine) (1982), a sentimental story of an aging writer who returns to Spain after many years in exiled following the civil war. The film was the first Spanish motion picture to win the Academy Award for Best Foreign Language Film.

Sesión continua (Double Feature), (1984, which also received an Academy Award nomination,  and Asignatura aprobada (Course Completed, 1987) gave emphasis to sentimentality. Canción de cuna (Cradle Song, 1994), a film adaptation of the sentimental Gregorio Martinez Sierra play. Garci's subsequently films include  La herida luminosa (The Wound of Light, 1997), and El abuelo (The Grandfather, 1998), which was Spain's submission for the Best Foreign Film category of the Academy Awards, getting the final nomination.

Recently, Garci directed Una historia de entonces (You're the One, 2000), Historia de un beso (Story of a Kiss, 2002)), Tiovivo c. 1950 (2004), Ninette (2005), Luz de domingo (2007), Sangre de mayo (2008) and  Holmes & Watson. Madrid Days (2012). In addition to filmmaking, he is a popular television and radio sportscaster in his homeland.

Filmography

Sources
 Emotion pictures. El cine de José Luis Garci, foreword by José Luis Garci, Notorious Ediciones, Madrid, 2018; 
Benavent, Francisco María, Cine Español de los Noventa, ediciones Mensajero, 2000; 
D'Lugo, Marvin:   Guide to the Cinema of Spain, Greenwood Press, 1997; 
Stone, Rob, Spanish Cinema, Pearson Education, 2002; 
 Torres, Augusto, Diccionario del cine Español, Espasa Calpe, 1994;

References

External links
 

1944 births
Living people
Spanish film producers
Spanish male writers
Spanish male film actors
Spanish television presenters
Film producers from Madrid
Film directors from Madrid
Male actors from Madrid
Best Director Goya Award winners
Directors of Best Foreign Language Film Academy Award winners
20th-century Spanish screenwriters
20th-century Spanish male writers
21st-century Spanish screenwriters